St. Jago's Arch is a historic sandstone arch in the British Overseas Territory of Gibraltar. It is the original entrance to a 16th-century Spanish church located at the southern limits of the old town.

History
The ornate sandstone arch is set into the western façade of St. Jago's Barracks at the southern end of Main Street, near Southport Gates. The arch is all that remains of the 16th century Spanish Hermitage of Our Lady of the Rosary. When the British converted the church into military stores, following the 1704 Capture of Gibraltar, the arch was kept and set into the façade of the larger barracks. Anton van den Wyngaerde's 1567 detailed panoramic sketch of Gibraltar and its bay depicts the Hermitage of Our Lady of the Rosary at the southern limits of the city walls.

Conservation
St. Jago's Arch is defined as a Category B Listed Structure by the Government of Gibraltar under section 40 of the Gibraltar Heritage Trust Act of 1989. On 26 June 2013, Minister for Culture and Heritage Steven Linares MP, announced in his budget speech that a conservation project being carried out on the walls surrounding Southport Gates was being extended to include the restoration of St. Jago's Arch. The project will include information and lighting of the monument.

Gallery

References

16th-century churches
Roman Catholic churches in Gibraltar
Arches and vaults in Gibraltar
Sandstone buildings